Kehta Hai Dil is an Indian soap opera that aired on Star Plus channel from 2 July 2002 to 29 March 2005, and is produced by UTV Software Communications. The story is based on the life of a girl named Karishma and portrays the dramatic events that occur in her life, which affect her entire family - who lives in the small, idyllic town of Anand Nagar. The series was initially based on Star World series Picket Fences. However soon the story was entirely deviated from Picket Fences.

Plot
Kehta Hai Dil is the story of a family who lives in the small, idyllic town of Anand Nagar. It is the family of Superintendent of Police (SP) Adityapratap Singh, Dr. Jaya Singh, and their three children - Karishma, Kunal and Kiran. Karishma loves Dhruv who is her childhood friend. Their fathers have also been friends.

SP Adityapratap tries to expose the corrupt town mayor Bhandari and his wife Lalita Devi. To take revenge, Lalita makes her elder son Nikhil befriend Karishma and then makes the media print a fake report alleging that Karishma is having an affair with Nikhil. This forces Karishma to marry Nikhil. It is only after they are married that the Bhandaris' lies is revealed. A devastated Karishma vows to take revenge on every single one of them. The story follows Karishma as she extracts her revenge and exposes the Bhandaris.

Cast
 Kamya Panjabi / Pallavi Kulkarni as Karishma Singh / Karishma Nikhil Bhandari
 Aman Verma / Akshay Anand as SP Adityapratap Singh
 Gautami Kapoor as Dr. Jaya Adityapratap Singh
 Swapnil Joshi as Dhruv
 Manoj Joshi as Mayor Bhandari
 Rushad Rana as Nikhil Bhandari, the Mayor's Adopted Son
 Grusha Kapoor as Lalita Devrani Devi , Mayor Bhandari's Wife and Nikhil's Adopted Mother 
 Ram Kapoor as Jai Singh
 Nivedita Bhattacharya as Mrs. Singh
 Manoj Pahwa as Ranbir
 Kuljeet Randhawa as Sonia
 Mehul Kajaria as Kunal Singh
 Tanvi Bhatia as Kiran Singh
 Dara Singh as Karishma's Grandfather 
 Soumya Arya as Dr. Talwar
 Kajal Nishad as Priya
 Rajeev Kumar as Inspector Vikram
 Lata Sabharwal as Constable's Wife
 S.P Khere as Ameeta's Father 
 Reshma Polekar as Ameeta
 Suhita Thatte as Sarson 
 Pamela Mukherjee as Divya
 Devanshi as Sonia's Son
 Sushmita Daan as Nilanjana
 Atul Srivastava as Charandas
 Hrishita as Deepti
 Shagufta Ali as Jaya's Mother
 Rakesh as Pappu
 Tina Parekh as Dhruv's Friend
 Rajesh Asthana as Inspector
 Khyaati Khandke Keswani as Aanchal
 Abbas Khan as Chota Pappu
 Shadab Khan as Doctor
 Sunita Verma as Menka
 Rajni Chandra as Nikhil's Mother 
 Manav Merchant as Ravi
 Dinesh Hinge as Judge
 Navin Nischol as Pradhan
 Natasha Sinha as Manju
 Tanvir Roy as Chief Minister
 Rahul Lohani as Swayam
 Prithvi Zutshi as Professor
 Pankaj Mishra as Narayan
 Narendra Gupta as Dr. Jain
 Salil Ankola as Ranveer Rathore / Sandeep Jain / Shakti Singh
 Veerendra Saxena as Bijlani
 Nagesh Bhonsle as Inspector Pandey
 Sandeep Vohra as Prosecutor
 Sunil Verma as Prisoner
 Sunil Ghate as Judge
 Kavita Vaid
 Pooja as Shangrila

Reception
Aired on Tuesdays at prime time, it became the most watched Hindi show in its slot and one of the top ten Hindi GEC overall. Despite deviating entirely from Picket Fences, it was one of the top shows. In third week of August 2004, it garnered 7.1 TVR. Between July to October 2004, it averaged 9.6 TVR with a peak rating of 10.5 TVR. From 20 December 2004 to 15 January 2005 it garnered an average ratings of 11.2 TVR.

Soundtrack
The music for Kehta Hai Dil was composed by Lalit Sen, and the lyrics were penned by Naqsh Lyalpuri. The title track was sung by Kumar Sanu, Mahalakshmi Iyer, and Priya Bhattachariya.

Awards 
The series has won the following awards in The Indian Telly Awards of 2003:
 Best Actor in a Negative Role (Male) - Manoj Joshi Shared with Mohnish Behl.
 Best Actor of the Year (Male) - Aman Verma shared with Shivaji Satam.

References

External links 
Kehta Hai Dil Official Site on STAR Plus
Watch Entire Episodes Kehta Hai Dil Online

StarPlus original programming
Indian television series
2002 Indian television series debuts
2005 Indian television series endings
Indian television soap operas
UTV Television